Maylson Barbosa Teixeira (born 6 March 1989), simply known as Maylson, is a Brazilian footballer who plays as a midfielder for Novo Hamburgo.

Club career

Grêmio
Born in São Bernardo do Campo, Maylson started his career on Grêmio in 2005, playing for the youth team. A versatile midfielder, he's one of rising stars from the club. On November 11, 2007, he made his first team debut, in a 1–0 away loss against São Paulo, playing the full match. He also played the following game,
a 0–3 away win over América de Natal. Maylson assisted the first goal, scored by Willian Magrão, with a brilliant pass.

In January 2008, he feature in the Copa São Paulo de Futebol Júnior and after his good performances, Grêmio rejected a £3 million bid from the German company Rogon Sportmanagement.

Sport Recife
Maylson joined Brazilian Série B side Sport on loan until the end of the season on 19 May 2011.

International career

Brazil Youth

He was part of the Brazil Under-19 national team and was selected to play for the Brazil Under-20 national team in the 2009 South American Youth Championship. On August 31, Maylson was called again for national side, this time for the 2009 FIFA U-20 World Cup.

Honours
International
South American Youth Championship: 2009

References

External links
  Maylson at Soccerway
  CBF

1989 births
Living people
People from São Bernardo do Campo
Brazilian footballers
Association football midfielders
Campeonato Brasileiro Série A players
Campeonato Brasileiro Série B players
Grêmio Foot-Ball Porto Alegrense players
Sport Club do Recife players
Associação Portuguesa de Desportos players
Figueirense FC players
Criciúma Esporte Clube players
Associação Chapecoense de Futebol players
Red Bull Brasil players
Londrina Esporte Clube players
Clube Náutico Capibaribe players
Brazil youth international footballers
Brazil under-20 international footballers
Footballers from São Paulo (state)